NNF may mean:Net financial flows: financial assets- financial liabilities

 Name Not Final, an abbreviation in creative works placed after a Working title
 Namibia National Front
 Namibia Nature Foundation
 Food Union NNF, a Danish trade union
 Negation Normal Form (in mathematics, computer science, logic)
 Never Not Funny, Jimmy Pardo's award-winning weekly podcast
 NoNonsense Forum, an open-source easy-to-deploy forum solution